Tjasse is a glacier of the King Frederick VI Coast area in the Sermersooq municipality, southeastern Greenland.

This glacier is named after Þjazi, the powerful storm giant of Norse mythology.

Geography 
Tjasse is a broad glacier that flows roughly southeastward east of the smaller Ygdrasil glacier. Shortly after bending in an eastward direction it joins the right side of the Skinfaxe Glacier before its terminus in the Kattertooq fjord.

See also 
 List of glaciers in Greenland
 Rimfaxe (glacier)

References

External links 
 Vulnerability of Southeast Greenland Glaciers to Warm Atlantic Water From Operation IceBridge and Ocean Melting Greenland Data

Glaciers of Greenland
Sermersooq

sv:Tjasses Gletscher